Toivo Suursoo (born 13 November 1975) is an Estonian ice hockey coach and former professional player.

Suursoo was selected by the Detroit Red Wings with the 283rd overall pick in the 1994 NHL Entry Draft, becoming the first player born in Estonia, to be drafted in the National Hockey League (NHL). Suursoo played for Red Wings' affiliates, the Adirondack Red Wings and the Cincinnati Mighty Ducks in the American Hockey League (AHL), but was unable to earn an NHL deal.

Internationally, Suursoo competed for Estonia.

Career statistics

Regular season and playoffs

International statistics

References

External links
 
 Biography at ESBL

1975 births
Adirondack Red Wings players
Amur Khabarovsk players
Cincinnati Mighty Ducks players
Detroit Red Wings draft picks
Estonian expatriate sportspeople in Belarus
Estonian expatriate sportspeople in Denmark
Estonian expatriate sportspeople in England
Estonian expatriate sportspeople in Finland
Estonian expatriate sportspeople in France
Estonian expatriate sportspeople in Latvia
Estonian expatriate sportspeople in Norway
Estonian expatriate sportspeople in Russia
Estonian expatriate sportspeople in Sweden
Estonian expatriate sportspeople in the United States
Estonian ice hockey right wingers
Expatriate ice hockey players in Russia
HC Neftekhimik Nizhnekamsk players
HC TPS players
Herning Blue Fox players
HK Riga 2000 players
IF Troja/Ljungby players
IK Oskarshamn players
Keramin Minsk players
Kongsvinger Knights players
Krylya Sovetov Moscow players
LHC Les Lions players
Living people
Luleå HF players
Malmö Redhawks players
Soviet Wings players
Sportspeople from Tallinn
Swindon Wildcats players
Estonian expatriate ice hockey people
Soviet ice hockey right wingers
Expatriate ice hockey players in Finland
Expatriate ice hockey players in Sweden
Expatriate ice hockey players in the United States
Expatriate ice hockey players in Denmark
Expatriate ice hockey players in Belarus
Expatriate ice hockey players in Latvia
Expatriate ice hockey players in England
Expatriate ice hockey players in France
Expatriate ice hockey players in Norway